Luca Ranieri (born 23 April 1999) is an Italian professional footballer who plays as a defender for Serie A club Fiorentina.

Club career

Fiorentina
Ranieri is the product of ACF Fiorentina youth teams and started playing for their Under-19 squad in the 2015–16 season. Late in the 2017–18 Serie A season he made several bench appearances for Fiorentina's senior squad, but did not see any time on the field.

Loan to Foggia
On 16 July 2018, Ranieri joined Serie B club Foggia on a season-long loan. On 26 August he made his professional debut in Serie B debut for Foggia as a 77th-minute substitute for Emanuele Cicerelli in a 4–2 home win over Carpi. One month later, on 27 October, Ranieri played his first match as a starter, a 2–2 home draw against Lecce, he was replaced by Giuseppe Loiacono in the 69th minute. Three days later, on 30 October, he played his first entire match for the team, a 1–1 away draw against Cittadella. Ranieri ended his season-long loan to Foggia with 29 appearances, including 26 as a starter, and 1 assist.

Loan to Ascoli
After having made his Serie A debut for Fiorentina, on 31 January 2020, Ranieri was loaned to Serie B side Ascoli until the end of the season. On the next day he made his debut for the club in a 3–0 away win over Livorno, he was replaced by Erick Ferigra in the 93rd minute. On 21 June he played his first entire match for the club, a 1–0 home defeat against Perugia. Ranieri ended his 6-month loan to Ascoli with only 10 appearances, including 9 as a starter.

Loan to SPAL
On 25 September 2020, Ranieri joined Serie B club SPAL on loan until 30 June 2021.

International career
Ranieri first was called up to represent his country in November 2014 for Italy national under-16 football team friendlies. He was later called up for the Under-17, Under-18, and eventually Under-20 squads. 

On 6 September 2019, he made his debut for Italy U21 in a friendly against Moldova.

Career statistics

Club

Honours
Italy U20
FIFA U-20 World Cup fourth place: 2019

References

External links
 Profile at the ACF Fiorentina website 
 

Living people
1999 births
People from La Spezia
Footballers from Liguria
Italian footballers
Italy under-21 international footballers
Italy youth international footballers
Association football defenders
ACF Fiorentina players
Calcio Foggia 1920 players
Ascoli Calcio 1898 F.C. players
S.P.A.L. players
U.S. Salernitana 1919 players
Serie A players
Serie B players
Sportspeople from the Province of La Spezia